Life In Reverse is the third studio album released by Alabama rock group Lynam.  The tracks "Tanis," "Letting Go" and "By Your Side" were re-released on the band's fourth album, Slave to the Machine.

Track listing
 "Loved By Everyone"
 "Tanis"
 "Another Pretty Face"
 "Everybody's Girl"
 "In Case You Didn't Know"
 "By Your Side"
 "Letting Go"
 "Dead Again"
 "Descend"
 "Last Chance"

2004 albums
Lynam (band) albums